The 2020–21 Ferris State Bulldogs men's ice hockey season was the 46th season of play for the program and the 8th in the WCHA conference. The Bulldogs represented Ferris State University and were coached by Bob Daniels, in his 29th season.

Season
As a result of the ongoing COVID-19 pandemic the entire college ice hockey season was delayed. Because the NCAA had previously announced that all winter sports athletes would retain whatever eligibility they possessed through at least the following year, none of Ferris State's players would lose a season of play. However, the NCAA also approved a change in its transfer regulations that would allow players to transfer and play immediately rather than having to sit out a season, as the rules previously required.

From the very beginning Ferris State had a bad season. Losses piled up week after week and, as the year progressed, the team produced a record that was so dreadful it needs historical context to properly appreciate. The 2019–20 Ferris State team was the first season in the 45-year history of the program to finish with less than 10 wins. This season had seven times fewer wins (1 vs. 7). The team's only win on the year came against a Division III team, but not just any D-III program, Trine's program was just four years old and had yet to accomplish anything significant. Ferris State allowed over 4 goals per game on the year and scored nearly half as many themselves (if the Trine game is excluded they scored exactly 2 goals per game). The only saving grace for the Bulldogs is a tie they earned against Bemidji State, a ranked team no less. In the end, however, Ferris State went winless against their peers, an ignominious achievement accomplished by just two other teams in history: 1961 Brown and 1962 Colorado College.

Departures

Recruiting

Roster
As of September 11, 2020.

Standings

Schedule and Results

|-
!colspan=12 style=";" | Regular Season

|-
!colspan=12 style=";" | 

|- align="center" bgcolor="#e0e0e0"
|colspan=12|Ferris State Lost Series 0–2

Scoring statistics

Goaltending statistics

Rankings

USCHO did not release a poll in week 20.

References

Ferris State Bulldogs men's ice hockey seasons
Ferris State Bulldogs
Ferris State Bulldogs
Ferris State Bulldogs
Ferris State Bulldogs
Ferris State Bulldogs